James J. Hewitt (born January 28, 1933) was a Canadian politician, who represented the riding of Boundary-Similkameen in the Legislative Assembly of British Columbia from 1975 to 1988 as a member of the Social Credit Party. He held several roles in the Executive Council of British Columbia during his term as an MLA, including Minister of Agriculture, Minister of Energy and Minister of Consumer and Corporate Affairs.

Although retired from elected politics, Hewitt actively campaigned against the province's 2009 electoral reform referendum.

References

1933 births
Living people
British Columbia Social Credit Party MLAs
Members of the Executive Council of British Columbia
People from Penticton
Politicians from Toronto